

Historical or architectural interest bridges

Major bridges

See also 

 Transport in Zambia
 Roads in Zambia
 Rail transport in Zambia
 Geography of Zambia
 List of rivers of Zambia
 List of crossings of the Zambezi River

References 
 Nicolas Janberg, Structurae.com, International Database for Civil and Structural Engineering

 Others references

Further reading 
 
 

Zambia

b
Bridges